Casmaria ponderosa, common name the heavy bonnet,  is a species of large sea snail, a marine gastropod mollusk in the family Cassidae, the helmet snails and bonnet snails.

Subspecies 
 Casmaria ponderosa perryi (Iredale, T., 1912): synonym of Casmaria perryi (Iredale, 1912)
 Casmaria ponderosa unicolor (Dautzenberg, Ph., 1926): synonym of Casmaria unicolor (Pallary, 1926)

Description
The size of an adult shell varies between 30 mm and 100 mm.

Distribution
This species occurs in the Red Sea, in the Indian Ocean along the Mascarene Basin, and in the Pacific Ocean off Hawaii.

References

 Jensen, R. H. (1997). A Checklist and Bibliography of the Marine Molluscs of Bermuda. Unp. , 547 pp
 Drivas, J. & Jay, M. (1987). Coquillages de La Réunion et de l'Île Maurice. Collection Les Beautés de la Nature. Delachaux et Niestlé: Neuchâtel. ISBN 2-603-00654-1. 159 pp.
 Steyn, D.G & Lussi, M. (2005). Offshore Shells of Southern Africa: A pictorial guide to more than 750 Gastropods. Published by the authors. Pp. i–vi, 1–289
 Buijse J.A., Dekker H. & Verbinnen G. (2013) On the identity of Casmaria species (Gastropoda, Cassidae), with descriptions of two new species. Acta Conchyliorum 14: 3-93.
 Verbinnen G., Segers L., Swinnen F., Kreipl K. & Monsecour D. (2016). Cassidae. An amazing family of seashells. Harxheim: ConchBooks. 251 pp

External links
 
 Gmelin J.F. (1791). Vermes. In: Gmelin J.F. (Ed.) Caroli a Linnaei Systema Naturae per Regna Tria Naturae, Ed. 13. Tome 1(6). G.E. Beer, Lipsiae 
 Link, D.H.F. (1807-1808). Beschreibung der Naturalien-Sammlung der Universität zu Rostock. Adlers Erben. 
 Reeve, L. A. (1848). Monograph of the genus Cassis. In: Conchologia Iconica, or, illustrations of the shells of molluscous animals, vol. 5, pls 1-12 and unpaginated text. L. Reeve & Co., London. 
 Menke, K. T. (1828). Synopsis methodica molluscorum generum omnium et specierum earum, quae in Museo Menkeano adservantur; cum synonymia critica et novarum specierum diagnosibus. XII + 91 pp.

Cassidae
Gastropods described in 1807